Agelena mengei is a spider species found in Switzerland, noted as nomen dubium in 2015.

See also 
 List of Agelenidae species

References

External links 

mengei
Spiders of Europe
Spiders described in 1877